The First Curtin ministry (Labor) was the 29th ministry of the Government of Australia. It was led by the country's 14th Prime Minister, John Curtin. The First Curtin ministry succeeded the Fadden ministry, which dissolved on 7 October 1941 after the independent crossbenchers Alexander Wilson and Arthur Coles withdrew their support for the Fadden government. The ministry was replaced by the Second Curtin ministry on 21 September 1943 following the 1943 federal election.

Frank Forde, who died in 1983, was the last surviving member of the First Curtin ministry; Forde was also the last surviving minister of the Scullin government, Second Curtin ministry, Forde government, and the First Chifley ministry.

Ministry

Notes

Ministries of George VI
Curtin, 1
Australian Labor Party ministries
1941 establishments in Australia
1943 disestablishments in Australia
Cabinets established in 1941
Cabinets disestablished in 1943